The 1930 Nevada Wolf Pack football team was an American football team that represented the University of Nevada in the Far Western Conference (FWC) during the 1930 college football season. In their second season under head coach George Philbrook, the team compiled a 2–4–2 record (2–1 against conference opponents), outscored opponents by a total of 77 to 73, and finished in second place in the conference.

Schedule

Players
The following individuals played for the 1930 Nevada team:
 Bill Backer – halfback
 Dick Barthels
 Drury – fullback
 Chester Elliott – halfback
 John Griffin – tackle
 Lloyd Guffrey
 Jack Hill – halfback
 Kell – guard/tackle
 Lefebvre – halfback
 Art Levy – end/quarterback
 Walt Linehan
 Bob Madriaga – guard
 McGarraghan – guard
 Matt Mohorovich – center
 Hank Rampoldi – tackle/end
 Risley – quarterback/halfback
 Wally Rusk – guard
 Neil Scott – end
 Clem Sultenfuss – halfback
 Olie Thies – tackle
 Jack Walther – center
 Willard Weaver – end
 Harold Willard
 Milton Young – quarterback

References

Nevada
Nevada Wolf Pack football seasons
Nevada Wolf Pack football